Royal Challengers Bangalore (RCB) is a franchise cricket team based in Bangalore, India, which plays in the Indian Premier League (IPL). They were one of the eight teams that competed in the 2008 Indian Premier League. They were captained by Rahul Dravid. Royal Challengers Bangalore finished seventh in the IPL and did not qualify for the champions league T20.

Indian Premier League season

Standings
Royal Challengers Bangalore finished seventh in the league stage of IPL 2008.

Results

References

Royal Challengers Bangalore seasons
2000s in Bangalore
2008 Indian Premier League